Clinton Township is one of twelve townships in Boone County, Indiana. As of the 2010 census, its population was 886 and it contained 351 housing units.

History
Scotland Bridge was listed on the National Register of Historic Places in 1994.

Geography

Unincorporated towns
 Elizaville

Adjacent townships
 Center (southwest)
 Marion (east)
 Washington (west)
 Jackson Township, Clinton County (northwest)
 Kirklin Township, Clinton County (northeast)

Major highways
  Indiana State Road 47

Cemeteries
The township contains one cemetery, Garrett.

References

Notes

Sources
 
 United States Census Bureau cartographic boundary files

External links

 Indiana Township Association
 United Township Association of Indiana

Townships in Boone County, Indiana
Townships in Indiana